Wainwright is an Anglo-Saxon occupational surname derived from the pre-7th century Old English word waegnwyrhta.  The prefix, "waeg(e)n/waen, refers to a vehicle/wagon, common in its time as being horse-driven and four-wheeled.  The suffix, wyrhta/wright, refers to a maker/builder.  The earliest public record of the name dates to 1237 in Essex.  Variations include  Wainewright, Wainright, Waynewright, Wainwrigt and Winwright. Notable people with the surname include:
 Aaron Wainwright (born 1997), Welsh rugby union player.
 Adam Wainwright (born 1981), American baseball pitcher for the St. Louis Cardinals
 Alfred Wainwright (1907–1991), writer of guide books to the fells of the English Lake District, including List of Wainwrights
Alfred Wainwright (cricketer) (1883–1971), South African cricketer
 Alisha Wainwright (born 1989), American actress
 Arthur Wainwright, English footballer
 Charles S. Wainwright (1826–1907), American artillery officer during the American Civil War
 Edgar Thomas Wainwright (born 1868), Scottish sculptor
 George L. Wainwright, Jr. (born 1943), American judge, Associate Justice of the North Carolina Supreme Court
 Geoffrey Wainwright (born 1939), British Methodist theologian
 Harriet Wainwright (1766–1843), British composer, singer, writer, and entrepreneur
 Harry Wainwright, locomotive, carriage and wagon superintendent of the South Eastern and Chatham Railway
 Helen Wainwright,  American diver and freestyle swimmer
 Henry Wainwright (died 1875), English brushmaker and murderer
 Hilary Wainwright (born 1949), British socialist and feminist
 Jonathan Mayhew Wainwright (bishop) (1792–1854), b. Liverpool, England, Americal Episcopal Bishop and father of Jonathan Mayhew Wainwright II
 Jonathan Mayhew Wainwright II (1821–1863), Lieutenant in the United States Navy during the US Civil War, grandfather of Jonathan Mayhew Wainwright IV.
 Jonathan Mayhew Wainwright IV (1883–1953), United States Army general during World War II, recipient of the Medal of Honor, Japanese Prisoner of War, and the last "fighting general."
 Loudon Wainwright Jr. (1924–1988), American columnist and editor.
 Loudon Wainwright III (born 1946), American songwriter, folk singer, humorist, actor, father of Martha and Rufus Wainwright
 Louie L. Wainwright, Secretary of Florida Division of Corrections; respondent in Gideon v. Wainwright and other famous Supreme Court cases
Lyndon Wainwright (1919–2018), English ballroom and Latin exhibition dancer.
Mark Wainwright, Australian academic
Martha Wainwright (born 1976), Canadian-American singer-songwriter, daughter of Loudon Wainwright III
Martin Wainwright, British journalist
Michael Wainwright (musician), Canadian musician
Richard Wainwright (politician) (1918–2003), British Liberal politician
Richard Wainwright (Civil War naval officer) (1817–1862), United States Navy Commander, father of Admiral Richard Wainwright
Richard Wainwright (Spanish-American War naval officer) (1849–1926), United States Navy Admiral, son of Commander Richard Wainwright
Richard Wainwright (World War I naval officer) (1881–1944), United States Navy Commander, son of Admiral Richard Wainwright
Rob Wainwright (rugby union) (born 1965), rugby union player, capped 37 times for Scotland (captain 16 times) and once for the British Lions
Rufus Wainwright (born 1973), Canadian-American singer-songwriter, son of Loudon Wainwright III
Sally Wainwright, English dramatist and television writer
Ted Wainwright (1865–1919), English cricketer
Thomas Wainwright (cricketer) (1940–2019), English cricketer
Victor Wainwright (born 1981), American blues and boogie-woogie singer, songwriter, and pianist
William Wainwright, British musician better known under his artist name William Orbit. Other aliases include Wayne Wright
William Edward Wainwright (1873–1959), mine manager in Broken Hill, New South Wales, Australia
William L. Wainwright, American politician, member of the North Carolina General Assembly

See also
 Justice Wainwright (disambiguation)

References

Occupational surnames
English-language surnames
English-language occupational surnames